Sagharan or Saqaran or Saqeran, also rendered as Saghari, may refer to:

Sagharan-e Olya
Sagharan-e Sofla